Tango libre is a 2012 comedy film directed by Frédéric Fonteyne. In January 2014 the film received ten nominations at the 4th Magritte Awards. 

The film centers on complicated personal relations between some prisoners in a French prison, their family members, and prison guards. A constant theme underlying the action is Argentine tango, which is learnt by many characters, both inside and outside the prison.

Cast
 François Damiens as Jean-Christophe
 Sergi López i Ayats as Fernand
 Jan Hammenecker as Dominic
 Anne Paulicevich as Alice
 Zacharie Chasseriaud as Antonio
 Christian Kmiotek as Michel
 David Murgia as Luc, the young guard
 Frédéric Frenay as Patrick, the tattooed man
 Dominique Lejeune as Popeye
 Marc Charlet as Marco
 Mariano Frúmboli as the Argentinian

References

External links
 

2012 films
2012 comedy films
French comedy films
Belgian comedy films
2010s French-language films
French-language Belgian films
Films directed by Frédéric Fonteyne
2010s French films